Microbacterium resistens is a bacterium from the genus Microbacterium which has been isolated from a corneal ulcer in Zürich, Switzerland.

References

Further reading

External links
Type strain of Microbacterium resistens at BacDive -  the Bacterial Diversity Metadatabase	

Bacteria described in 1998
resistens